The 1991 Canal Plus European Challenge was a professional non-ranking snooker tournament that took place between 17 and 18 July 1991 at the Happy European Sports & Business Centre in Waregem, Belgium.

Jimmy White won the tournament beating Steve Davis 4–1 in the final.

Main draw

References

European Challenge
1991 in snooker
1991 in Belgian sport
European Challenge